Group I of the 2019 FIBA Basketball World Cup was the second stage of the 2019 FIBA Basketball World Cup for four teams, top two teams from Group A and two from Group B. The results from the first round were carried over. The teams played against the teams from the group they have not faced before, for a total of two games per team, with all games played at Foshan International Sports and Cultural Center, Foshan. After all of the games were played, the top two teams advanced to Quarter-finals, the third placed team was classified 9 to 12 and the fourth placed team 13 to 16.

Qualified teams

Standings

All times are local UTC+8.

Games

Poland vs. Russia

Argentina vs. Venezuela

Venezuela vs. Russia

Poland vs. Argentina

References

External links

2019 FIBA Basketball World Cup